Valade or Valadè is a surname. Notable people with the surname include:

Ambrogio Valadé (1937–2007), Italian footballer
Aymeline Valade (born 1984), French model and actress
Georges Valade (1922–1997), Canadian politician
Jean Valade (1710–1787), French painter